Schoenionta strigosa is a species of beetle in the family Cerambycidae. It was described by Pascoe in 1867. It is known from Sumatra, Borneo and Malaysia.

References

Saperdini
Beetles described in 1867